Sakao Island, locally known as Lathi or Laðhi, is an uninhabited island in Vanuatu. It is located off the northeastern shore of Vanuatu's largest island Espiritu Santo in Sanma Province. It has given its name to the Sakao language, spoken in the nearby area of Port-Olry.

See also
List of islands of Vanuatu

References

Islands of Vanuatu
Sanma Province
Uninhabited islands of Vanuatu